Barclays Center is a multi-purpose indoor arena in the New York City borough of Brooklyn. The arena is home to the Brooklyn Nets of the National Basketball Association and the New York Liberty of the Women's National Basketball Association. The arena also hosts concerts, conventions and other sporting and entertainment events.

The arena is part of a $4.9 billion future business and residential complex now known as Pacific Park.

The arena, proposed in 2004 when real estate developer Bruce Ratner purchased the Nets for $300 million as the first step of the process to build a new home for the team, experienced significant hurdles during its development. Its use of eminent domain and its potential environmental impact brought massive community resistance, especially as residential buildings and businesses such as the Ward Bakery were to be demolished and large amounts of public subsidies were used, which led to multiple lawsuits. The global recession of 2009 also caused financing for the project to dry up. As a result, construction was delayed until 2010, with no secure funding for the project having been allotted. Groundbreaking for construction occurred on March 11, 2010, and the arena opened on September 21, 2012, which some 200 protesters also attended. Its first event was a Jay-Z concert on September 28, 2012.

The arena is owned by the State of New York's Empire State Development authority through a public entity named the Brooklyn Arena Local Development Corporation. It is leased by Brooklyn Event Center LLC, owned by Brooklyn Nets owner Joseph Tsai, with operations (and associated revenue) managed by Tsai's BSE Global.

History
The arena was conceived by Bruce Ratner of real estate developer Forest City Ratner Companies, the New York division of Forest City Enterprises that Ratner founded. He acquired the New Jersey Nets basketball team in 2004 for $300 million (he has since sold most of his shares to continue funding the project) for the purpose of moving them to the Pacific Park development on Brooklyn's Prospect Heights play in the arena that would be the centerpiece of the Pacific Park commercial and residential redevelopment project. The move had marked the return of major league sports to Brooklyn, which had been absent since the departure of the Dodgers to Los Angeles in 1957. Coincidentally, the original proposal for a domed stadium for the Brooklyn Dodgers was just north of the Pacific Park Brooklyn site, where the Atlantic Terminal Mall, also owned by Forest City Ratner Companies, is located.

The arena was initially projected to open in 2006, with the rest of the Pacific Park Brooklyn complex to follow. However, controversies involving local residents, the use of eminent domain, potential environmental impact, lack of continued public financing, as well as a major economic downturn delayed the project. Due to these legal and financial troubles, the development deal seemed headed towards failure or collapse. Frank Gehry, an architect involved in the project's initial designs said, in March 2009, "I don't think it is going to happen," and Ratner at one point explored selling the team. The New York Supreme Court ruled in favor of Ratner on May 16, 2009. Opponents appealed the court decision. A hearing for the appeal was scheduled for October 14, 2009, with a decision to be issued no sooner than November 25.

Russian businessman Mikhail Prokhorov agreed to a $200 million deal on September 23, 2009, to become a principal owner of the Nets and a key investor in the Brooklyn arena.

The Nets played two preseason games at Prudential Center in October 2009. The two preseason games were successful, and a deal that would have the Nets play at the Prudential Center for the 2010–11 and 2011–12 NBA seasons became more likely. Negotiations nearly fell apart, when the New Jersey Sports and Exhibition Authority refused to release the Nets from their lease at Izod. Negotiations resumed, and on February 18, 2010, the Nets finalized a deal that would move them to the Prudential Center in Newark, New Jersey until Barclays Center opened.

The New York Court of Appeals ruled in favor of the state using eminent domain for the project on November 24, 2009. Empire State Development Corporation Vice President Warner Johnston indicated that the agency was committed to seeing the project completed and said "we can now move forward with development."

Another potential roadblock to this development resulted from the Appellate Court's negative decision regarding a similar eminent domain case, brought against Columbia University. This landmark case could have given new life to the case being brought by the community group Develop Don't Destroy Brooklyn (DDDB).

However, on March 1, 2010, Brooklyn Supreme Court Justice Abraham Gerges struck down a challenge by property owners, regarding the state's use of eminent domain, which allowed the private property to be condemned. Groundbreaking for the project occurred on March 11, 2010.

The first concrete was poured into Barclays Center's foundation on June 29, 2010. The arena began vertical construction on November 23, 2010, with the erection of the first steel piece. The arena topped out on January 12, 2012, and was opened to the public on September 21, 2012.

Barclays Bank agreed to a 20-year naming rights agreement for $400 million in 2007. However, two years later, due to the slump in the economy the deal was renegotiated to $200 million.

The New York Islanders of the National Hockey League (NHL) announced on October 24, 2012, that the franchise would move to Barclays Center in 2015 after the expiration of their lease at the Nassau Veterans Memorial Coliseum, which the team had called home since its inception in 1972. The deal did not require the involvement of the New York Rangers, as the Islanders' agreement with the Rangers to share the New York area allows them to play their home games anywhere on Long Island, including the two city boroughs on the island, Brooklyn and Queens. While Barclays Center was conceived as a multipurpose arena that could accommodate the Nets and an NHL team, it was built mainly for basketball. While it can accommodate an NHL-size rink, the scoreboard was off-centered above the blue line that is closer to the arena's southeast end. Capacity for hockey is 15,795, the second-smallest in the league (behind Winnipeg's Canada Life Centre). The seating arrangement for hockey is asymmetrical. There are only three rows of permanent seating on the northwest end of the arena, and at least 416 seats will not be sold at all due to poor sight lines. As a result of the signing of the lease, the two KHL games scheduled to be played in the arena on January 20 and 21, 2013 between Dynamo Moscow and SKA St. Petersburg were moved back to their teams' home venues. As part of the deal, the management of the Barclays Center took over the business operations of the Islanders when the team moved to Brooklyn, though Charles Wang remained principal owner and continued to oversee hockey operations. This arrangement continued after Wang sold controlling interest in the Islanders to Jon Ledecky and Scott D. Malkin. Business operations were returned to the Islanders following the 2018–19 season.

According to Billboard magazine, Barclays Center passed Madison Square Garden as the highest-grossing venue in the US for concerts and family shows, not counting sports events. That statistic was based on ticket sales between November 1, 2012, and May 31, 2013. On February 24, 2015, an ironworker was killed when four joists fell on him as he was helping to install the arena's green roof.

Poor reception of the arena's quality as a hockey venue affected the Islanders' average attendance in comparison to Nassau Coliseum, which fell to an NHL low of 12,059 (the arena itself is also the second-smallest in the league). The team began to seek an exit from Barclays, although NHL officials judged that the Coliseum (even with its recent renovations) would not be suitable as a full-time venue, as it lacked amenities common in new facilities. On June 21, 2018, the Islanders announced that they would begin to play a portion of their home schedule at Nassau Coliseum until the completion of UBS Arena.

On September 18, 2019, Joe Tsai completed the acquisition of full ownership of the Brooklyn Nets and Barclays Center. With the closing of the transaction, Tsai became NBA Governor of the Nets and its affiliates and Chairman of Barclays Center. Additionally, on September 18, 2019, media and sports executive David Levy was named Chief Executive Officer of the Brooklyn Nets and Barclays Center by Joe Tsai. Tsai also purchased the WNBA's New York Liberty in 2019 and relocated the team to the Barclays Center in 2020. For Liberty games, ticket sales will initially be capped at about 8,000.

In July 2021, it was announced that as part of a deal with the Nets and BSE Global, SeatGeek would take over ticketing duties for Barclays Center events beginning with the 2021-22 Brooklyn Nets season, ending the arena's relationship with Ticketmaster and breaking Ticketmaster's monopoly over ticketing for New York's major arenas. In January 2023, it was announced that the deal would end earlier than expected and that Ticketmaster would return to handle ticketing for Barclays Center events starting with the 2023 New York Liberty season, as well for events whose tickets went on sale on or after January 14, 2023. Sources later told Billboard that BSE Global ended the deal with SeatGeek after encountering multiple technical issues, which led to lower than expected ticket sales for concerts at the arena.

Financing
The arena is formally owned by the Brooklyn Arena Local Development Corporation, a public entity. It is leased to private entity Brooklyn Events Center, LLC for $1.00. Being publicly owned, the financing of the stadium was eligible for tax-exempt bonds, which were issued in 2009 for a total of $510,999,996.50.

Design

Barclays Center was designed by the architect firm SHoP Architects. Ellerbe Becket/AECOM served as the project Architect of record.

Initial concepts for the area were designed by Frank Gehry, whose design proposed a rooftop park (open only to residents of the Atlantic Yards complex) ringed by an open-air running track and capable of doubling as an ice skating rink in winter with panoramic, year-round views of Manhattan. The famed architect's tallest tower, called Miss Brooklyn at 620 feet, was also part of this plan. Gehry's plans carried a projected cost of $1 billion. Forest City Ratner unveiled a scaled-back version of the project in February 2008 reducing Miss Brooklyn's size 40%, and making it  shorter. Another redesign unveiled just over two months later scrapped Miss Brooklyn entirely, and in January 2009, the developer started "value engineering" the arena design, cutting its budget even more. In September 2009 the Becket/SHoP proposal with a projected cost (initially) of $800 million (ultimately itself revised to $1 billion) was unveiled.

Externally, the arena's shape features three articulated bands with features a glass curtain wall covered by a "latticework" composed of 12,000 preweathered steel panels engineered and constructed by ASI Limited/SHoP Construction meant to evoke the image of Brooklyn's brownstones. A  oculus extends over a  section of the plaza outside of the main arena entrance with an irregularly shaped display screen looping the interior face of the oculus. The arena floor's location below grade allows people in the plaza to view the scoreboard.

There are two sports lighting systems inside the arena bowl: one for the Nets and one for everyone else. The Nets lighting creates a theater-like effect where the court pops like a stage while the rest of the arena goes dark.

Unlike most other urban venues in the US, Barclays Center has no dedicated parking lot; however, it is easily accessible by subway, bus, and railroad. To accommodate entry to the facility, the arena's  entrance plaza features a $76 million transit connection hub that serves as the plaza's focal point. The transit structure connects with the refurbished Atlantic Avenue–Barclays Center subway station, whose renovation was designed by New York City firm Stantec.

The original plan promised indoor room for bicycles, but the plan was scrapped before the arena's opening with outdoor racks for 400 bicycles, which were eventually taken away. The Empire State Development corporation also promised spots for 550 cars eventually, next to the arena.

Because of the constrained site, there are only two truck and bus entrances into the building. Vehicles roll out onto an enormous turntable which rotates them into position opposite one of four loading docks arrayed around the turntable.

Artwork

According to Parlá, the painting is all about language; the painting contains words and phrases such as "immigration," "Brooklyn is" and "Big Daddy Kane." The piece was commissioned in 2012 and took six months to complete.

Naming rights

On January 18, 2007, it was announced that the arena would be called Barclays Center, after London-based banking group Barclays. It was reported that the banking and financial services company agreed to pay the team $400 million over the next 20 years for the naming rights of their Brooklyn home, eclipsing the previous record for naming rights to an American indoor arena, set by Royal Philips Electronics in 1999, for $185 million over 20 years for Philips Arena in Atlanta. However, the rights were renegotiated by the end of 2009, and are somewhat more than $200 million. Barclays does not have any retail banks in the US nor does it have its own ATMs in the arena.

Accessibility and transportation
Barclays Center is located next to Atlantic Terminal, which services the Long Island Rail Road's Atlantic Branch.

Notable events

Basketball

The first NBA basketball game played at the new arena was an NBA preseason game between the Nets and the Washington Wizards on October 15, 2012.

The first regular-season NBA game at the Barclays Center took place on November 3, 2012, when the Nets beat the visiting Toronto Raptors 107–100. The originally scheduled season opener home game was supposed to take place on November 1 against now-cross town rivals the New York Knicks, in what was planned to be a historic event; however, the game was canceled by NYC Mayor Michael Bloomberg due to mass transportation outages and a shortage of available police caused by Hurricane Sandy.

The venue hosted the NBA draft starting with the 2013 event on June 27, 2013 and it has been ever since, except the 2020 event was held via videoconferencing. In addition to that, they have also hosted the NBA All-Star Weekend festivities in 2015.

Barclays Center was also the home for the Long Island Nets of the NBA Development League, now the NBA G League, during the 2016–17 season while the Nassau Veterans Memorial Coliseum was being renovated for the 2017–18 season.

College basketball
Since its opening, the center has hosted a number of college basketball events. Kentucky and Maryland signed multi-year agreements to play games at the arena after competing head-to-head in 2012. The arena hosts three early-season basketball tournaments: Barclays Center Classic, Coaches vs. Cancer Classic, and Legends Classic.

The Atlantic 10 Conference announced Barclays Center as the new home of the conference's men's basketball tournament beginning in 2013. The Atlantic Coast Conference announced the 2017 and 2018 ACC men's basketball tournament to be hosted at the Barclays Center. This is a break of tradition from being hosted at the "unofficial" home of the tournament at the Greensboro Coliseum in Greensboro, North Carolina where it is usually held. As part of a three-way agreement with Barclays and the ACC, the A-10 returned its men's basketball championship to the Barclays Center in 2019, 2020 (which was cancelled after the first round due to the COVID-19 pandemic and 2021 (which was moved to campus sites due the ongoing pandemic). The arena and the A-10 agreed to extend the partnership for the 2023 and 2024 championships.

In 2016, Barclays Center hosted games in the NCAA Division I men's basketball tournament for the first time. Notable moments at the Brooklyn site include a tip-in at the buzzer by Adam Woodbury to lift the Iowa Hawkeyes past Temple in overtime, 14th-seeded Stephen F. Austin's upset win over 3rd-seeded West Virginia, and Rex Plfueger's last-second tip-in to help Notre Dame avert an upset bid by Stephen F. Austin in the second round. The arena was scheduled to host an NCAA Regional in 2021, however the NCAA moved all games of the 2021 championship to the Indianapolis area. The arena and the Atlantic 10 will serve as a First and Second Round site for the 2024 NCAA tournament.

Hockey

The New York Islanders moved from Nassau Coliseum to Barclays Center before the 2015–16 NHL season. The Islanders played the first NHL hockey game at Barclays Center in a preseason game on September 21, 2013, losing to the New Jersey Devils 3–0 in front of a crowd of 14,689. The first goal in the arena's history was scored by Jacob Josefson of the New Jersey Devils. An Islanders game was scheduled for the previous preseason but was canceled due to the 2012–13 NHL lockout. The Islanders and Devils played again on September 26, 2014. This time, the Islanders defeated New Jersey 3–2 in a shootout. The first goal in Islanders Brooklyn history was scored in the first period on a power play (and a delayed penalty call) by defenseman Ryan Pulock.

The first regular-season game was played on October 9, 2015, against the 2015 Stanley Cup champions the Chicago Blackhawks, who won the game 3–2 in overtime. This was the sixth NHL game at Barclays Center, following five total preseason contests (three in 2015), and one Islanders rookie scrimmage. The first NHL regular-season goal scored in the Barclays Center was a shorthanded goal by Artem Anisimov for the Blackhawks in the first period, while John Tavares scored in the second period and was the first Islander to do so.

The first Stanley Cup playoffs game at Barclays Center was held on April 17, 2016, when the Islanders defeated the Florida Panthers 4–3 in game three of the first-round series between the two teams. Seven nights later, the arena hosted game 6 of the series, which turned out to be the longest home game in Islanders history. In that game, the Islanders were trailing 1–0 when Tavares scored the game-tying goal with 53.2 seconds left in regulation; he would score the series-clinching goal in double overtime to give the Islanders their first playoff series win since 1993.

The Islanders moved to the newly constructed UBS Arena in 2021–22 season. New York State governor Andrew Cuomo announced on February 29, 2020, that the Islanders would play all home games in the 2020–21 season at Nassau Coliseum, their former home. It was also announced that the Islanders would play all of their home playoff games during the 2020 Stanley Cup playoffs at Nassau Coliseum, meaning that their final game played at the Barclays Center was scheduled to be on March 22, 2020, against the Carolina Hurricanes. However, all NHL games were postponed on March 12 due to the COVID-19 pandemic in North America. At that point in time, the Islanders had six home games left in the regular season, two in Brooklyn and four in Nassau County, as well as six road games, and were one point shy of the eighth and final playoff spot in the Eastern Conference. The last Islanders game at Barclays Center before the season's pause was played on March 3, 2020, when the Islanders lost 6–2 to the Montreal Canadiens. While the Nassau Coliseum was closed indefinitely in June 2020, and the Islanders were reported to return to Barclays Center for the 2020–21 season if the Coliseum remained unavailable, a new leaseholder allowed the Islanders to play their 2020–21 home games there, meaning the final game at Barclays Center was March 3, 2020, against the Montreal Canadiens.

Boxing
Several boxing matches have taken place in the arena, including Danny Garcia vs. Zab Judah and Paulie Malignaggi vs. Adrien Broner in 2013, and Ruslan Provodnikov vs. Chris Algieri in 2014, and Deontay Wilder vs. Robert Helenius.

Mixed martial arts
The venue hosted UFC 208: Holm vs. de Randamie on February 11, 2017 and it hosted UFC 223: Khabib vs. Iaquinta on April 7, 2018, and UFC Fight Night: Cejudo vs. Dillashaw on January 19, 2019.

Gymnastics
On November 6, 2016, the arena hosted the Kellogg's Tour of Gymnastics Champions.

Music
In addition to many concerts from various musical acts, the center hosted the 2013 MTV Video Music Awards on August 25, 2013, bringing the show to a New York City borough other than Manhattan for the first time. The 2020 VMA ceremony was going to take place in Barclays Center but due to COVID-19, the ceremony took place outdoors in New York City. MTV confirmed that the show will take place there in 2021.

Professional wrestling
The arena has also hosted many WWE wrestling events since the arena's opening. The first show held at the venue was the Tables, Ladders, and Chairs PPV event which famously held the first match for The Shield (Roman Reigns, Seth Rollins, and Dean Ambrose). They would continue to hold several WWE Raw episodes including its 25th anniversary episode in January 2018. In August 2015, Barclays Center hosted SummerSlam along with NXT TakeOver: Brooklyn the night before and a post-SummerSlam Raw the next day, resulting in three consecutive nights of sellouts. They would continue annual weekends of SummerSlam events for the next three years with the inclusion of a post-SummerSlam SmackDown Live broadcast to the events.

The arena held another weekend of events in April 2019 for WrestleMania 35. This weekend included NXT TakeOver: New York, the 2019 WWE Hall of Fame induction ceremony, along with post-WrestleMania editions of Raw and SmackDown Live. In addition, the arena hosted Survivor Series on November 21, 2021, followed by Raw the next day.

Esports
The arena has hosted ESL One New York in October 2016, September 2017, September 2018, and September 2019.

In May 2018, Blizzard Entertainment announced the Grand Finals for the inaugural season of the Overwatch League would be held at Barclays Center. The event was held on July 27–28, 2018.

Issues

Legal actions
During its construction, the center was the source of a number of controversies involving local residents, the use of eminent domain, potential environmental impact, lack of continued public financing, as well as a major economic downturn that delayed the project. The New York Supreme Court ruled in favor of Ratner on May 16, 2009. Opponents appealed the court decision, and a hearing for the appeal was scheduled for October 14, 2009, with a decision to be issued no sooner than November 25.

On November 24, 2009, the New York Court of Appeals ruled in favor of the state using eminent domain for the project. Empire State Development Corporation Vice President Warner Johnston indicated that the agency is committed to seeing the project completed and said "we can now move forward with development."

Barclays Center has also been accused of mistreating luxury box holders who are African-American. Three employees of Ludwig's Pharmacy in Prospect Heights claimed in a lawsuit filed in October 2013 that they were singled out for bad treatment at the arena because they are black. They are suing for $4 million.

Labor issues
A group of 120 part-time construction workers who work to convert the arena from a concert hall to a sports venue unsuccessfully tried to switch unions in February 2013. The pay for part-time work is structured differently than that of the same work at Madison Square Garden, and workers have complained about not being able to make a living on one-day-a-month work at $14/hour, and being barred from collecting unemployment.

Quality as a hockey venue

As the arena was not originally designed with hockey in mind, the New York Islanders' move to Barclays Center resulted in complaints about seats with obstructed views and the arena's ice quality.

Some seats were singled out for having poor and obstructed sightlines during hockey games. Business Insider has called sections 201 to 204 and 228 to 231, "the worst seat in American professional sports". In an interview with Sports Illustrated, Barclays Center CEO Brett Yormark acknowledged the issue, but insisted nothing can be done: "There's really nothing we're going to do from a capital improvement standpoint. You can watch the game on your mobile device. The game is on the scoreboard." There have also been complaints over the quality of the ice during hockey games. The arena uses PVC piping instead of steel piping under the ice surface, making it much harder to maintain ice consistent with NHL standards for quality and temperature.

SeatGeek technical issues
SeatGeek's time as the ticketing provider for events at the arena was met with multiple technical issues, as well as lower than expected ticket sales for concerts that were partly caused by these issues. Billboard reported that a 2021 New Year's Eve show by The Strokes (which was later delayed to April 2022 due to concerns over the Omicron COVID-19 variant) experienced technical issues during a presale that cost the band hundreds of thousands of dollars according to their booking agents (the show ended up only selling 13,548 tickets and grossing $1,570,000 in total, which was 2,000 tickets and $400,000 less than the group's 2019 New Year's Eve show at the arena, which their booking agents blamed on SeatGeek's user interface and not the popularity of the band). In addition, a show by Genesis as part of their The Last Domino? Tour that was booked for the arena due to high demand for the tour's other shows in New York also experienced technical issues after tickets went on sale and saw lower than expected ticket sales, which led to the show later being canceled.

Gallery

References

External links

 

Barclays
Basketball venues in New York City
Boxing venues in New York City
Brooklyn Nets venues
Buildings and structures in Brooklyn
Clan Barclay
College basketball venues in the United States
Defunct NBA G League venues
Defunct National Hockey League venues
Forest City Realty Trust
Gymnastics venues in New York City
Indoor arenas in New York City
Indoor ice hockey venues in New York City
LIU Brooklyn Blackbirds men's basketball
Long Island Nets
Mixed martial arts venues in New York (state)
Music venues in Brooklyn
National Basketball Association venues
New York Liberty venues
Prospect Heights, Brooklyn
Sports venues completed in 2012
Sports venues in Brooklyn
2012 establishments in New York City
Esports venues in New York (state)
New York Islanders venues